Sylvanus Ngiji Ngele was elected Senator for the Ebonyi North constituency of Ebonyi State, Nigeria at the start of the Nigerian Fourth Republic, running on the People's Democratic Party (PDP) platform. He took office on 29 May 1999.
 
After taking his seat in the Senate he was appointed to committees on Ethics, Security & Intelligence (vice chairman), Environment and Health.

See also
 List of people from Ebonyi State

References

Living people
Peoples Democratic Party members of the Senate (Nigeria)
People from Ebonyi State
20th-century Nigerian politicians
21st-century Nigerian politicians
Year of birth missing (living people)